Great Andaman is the main archipelago of the Andaman Islands of India. It comprises seven major islands.  From north to south, these are North Andaman, Interview Island, Middle Andaman, Long Island, Baratang Island, South Andaman, and Rutland Island.

Geography
South, Middle and North islands are the largest of the entire island group. The islands' capital, Port Blair, is located on South Andaman.

Great Andaman group is often considered the counterpart to Little Andaman Group, another group of islands in the Andaman's.

The Andaman islands consist of four groups:
 Great Andaman 
 Little Andaman
 Ritchie's Archipelago
 East Volcano Islands

Narrow creeks split Great Andaman into North Andaman, Middle Andaman, South Andaman and the other major islands. All of these islands are in the form of peaks of a submerged mountain chain. Each island has a central highland surrounded by bordering flat lands sloping in all directions and finally merged into coastal tracts.

Demographics 
According to the 2011 census of India, the archipelago had 315,530 inhabitants.

References 

Archipelagoes of the Andaman and Nicobar Islands